Bruce John Collingwood (May 16, 1953 – August 28, 2017) was a provincial level politician from Alberta, Canada. He served as a member of the Legislative Assembly of Alberta from 1993 to 1997.

Political career
Collingwood was elected to the Alberta Legislature in the 1993 Alberta general election. He won the electoral district of Sherwood Park picking it up for the Liberals. He ran for a second term in office in the 1997 Alberta general election but was defeated by Progressive Conservative candidate Iris Evans.  After his political career, Collingwood practised law in Victoria, British Columbia until his death at the age of 64 in 2017.

References

External links
Legislative Assembly of Alberta Members Listing

1953 births
2017 deaths
Alberta Liberal Party MLAs
Politicians from Edmonton